The 1997 British Formula Three season was the 47th British Formula Three Championship, won by Jonny Kane. The season started on 23 March at Donington Park and ended at Thruxton on 12 October following sixteen races. Kane built on a strong finish to his 1996 campaign by scoring podium finishes at each of the first six races in 1997. This would be enough to keep title rival Nicolas Minassian at bay, who was hindered by a disqualification from second place and a two-race ban for unsportsmanlike behaviour at the third round at Thruxton. The Frenchman was baulked by backmarker Michael Bentwood whilst leading, allowing Kane to overtake and take victory. After the chequered flag, the infuriated Minassian proceeded to brake-test Bentwood to a halt and hurl gravel towards the Englishman. Without having lost the 15 points awarded for second position as well as further potential points at the next two races, it is highly likely that Minassian would have been champion.

Drivers and Teams

Race calendar and results

 Round 14 was contested by an assortment of entrants from other European F3 championships; they were eligible to score points.

Championship

Championship Class